PZL-Świdnik S.A. (Wytwórnia Sprzętu Komunikacyjnego PZL-Świdnik S.A.) is the biggest helicopter manufacturer in Poland. Its main products are PZL W-3 Sokół and PZL SW-4 Puszczyk helicopters.  In early 2010 the factory was acquired by AgustaWestland, today Leonardo.

History

History of plant establishment dating back to 1920, when in Lublin opened the first aircraft factory "Plage i Laśkiewicz". After World War II part of the senior instructors staff incorporated into the newly formed "Wytwórnia Sprzętu Komunikacyjnego".
In 1951 a third national aerospace factory, WSK-Świdnik, was built in Świdnik, and in 1957 it was renamed to WSK PZL-Świdnik. Since 1956 it has become one of the world's major helicopter manufacturers, producing helicopters under the Soviet licence, starting with the SM-1 (Mil Mi-1). Świdnik was the main producer of the Mi-1 and exclusive producer of the widely used in the world Mil Mi-2. Since the late 1980s, Świdnik has been producing a Polish-designed medium helicopter PZL W-3 Sokół. It also produces a light helicopter, the PZL SW-4 Puszczyk. After 1991 the state factory became a state-owned corporation (WSK "PZL-Świdnik" SA). It also produced the Pirat, PW-5 and PW-6 gliders and cooperates widely with other nations' manufacturers, e.g., in the manufacture of Agusta A109 fuselages.

In early 2010 the factory was acquired by AgustaWestland, today Leonardo.

Motorcycles

From 1954 until 1980 the WSK PZL-Świdnik was also a manufacturer of motorcycles, branded as the WSK. Some 2,000,000 motorcycles of the WSK M06 125 cc and WSK M21 175 cc families were made in that period.

Aircraft

See also
PZL

References

External links

 PZL-Świdnik official webpage 

Aircraft manufacturers of Poland
Helicopter manufacturers of Poland
Motorcycle manufacturers of Poland
AgustaWestland